In Aztec mythology,  was a creator and goddess of fertility, worshiped for peopling the earth and making it fruitful. She is also referred to as Ilhuicacihuātl or "Heavenly Lady."

Tonacacihuatl is depicted in the Codex Telleriano-Remensis.

Etymology
While  can be translated "woman" or "lady",  presents several possible interpretations. By this etymology,  would mean "Lady of Our Food" or "Lady of Our Flesh," most commonly rendered "Lady of Our Sustenance." The word  simply means "abundance," giving  the alternate reading "Lady of Abundance."

Origin and role
 was the Central Mexican form of the creator goddess common to Mesoamerican religions. In the Florentine Codex,  relates that Aztec midwives would tell newborns after bathing them, "You were created in the place of duality, the place above the nine heavens.

In 1629,  also reported the use of the goddess's name in ritual planting prayers, in which a seed of corn is entrusted to the earth deity  by a shaman who calls the kernel  ("my sister, the Lady of Abundance").

Nauhtzonteteo 
Ometecuhtli and Omecihuatl, or Tonacatecuhtli and Tonacacihuatl govern the divine nature divided into two gods (it is convenient to know man and woman; the man, who created and governed everything that is of the masculine gender and the woman everything that belonged to the feminine gender). Omecihuatl, for her part, gave birth to many children on the Thirteen Heavens with Ometecuhtli, and after all these births she had given birth to a flint, which in their language they call tecpatl, from which the other gods were amazed and frightened, their children agreed to throw it out of the heavens to the said flint, and thus they put into action, and that it fell in a certain part of the earth, called Chicomoztoc, which means 'Seven Caves', and that then one thousand and six hundred gods and goddesses came out of it, the Nauhtzonteteo that spread over the face of the earth, the sea, the underworld and the heavens.

Notes

References
 

 

Aztec goddesses
Creator goddesses
Fertility goddesses